1,3-Difluoro-trisulfane-1,1-difluoride is an inorganic molecular substance with the structure SF3SSF, consisting of sulfur in a low oxidation state with fluorine. The compound consists of a chain of three sulfur atoms, with three fluorine atoms bonded to the sulfur on one end and the fourth fluorine bonded to the sulfur on the other end. It has a melting point of -62 °C and a boiling point of 94 °C. As a gas, it is unstable and breaks up to form SSF2 and SF4.

SF3SSF is produced by the condensation of sulfur difluoride and an isomer of SSF2. The reaction S3F4  SSF2 + SF2 uses 6 kJ/mol.

Possible isomers of its S3F4 molecular formula include FSSF2SF, which has a spontaneous fluorine migration to yield F2SSSF2, which in turn spontaneously fragments to give SF2 and SSF2.

References

Sulfur fluorides